Sara Sloane can refer to:

 Ursula Bloom (1892–1984), British writer who used Sara Sloane as a pseudonym
 A character in an episode of The Simpsons, “A Star Is Born Again”